Polymorphida are an order of thorny-headed worms (phylum Acanthocephala). The adults of these parasitic platyzoans feed mainly on fish and aquatic birds.

This order contains 5 families:

Centrorhynchidae Van Cleave, 1916
Isthomosacanthidae Smales, 2012
Plagiorhynchidae Meyer, 1931
Pyriprobosicidae	 
Polymorphidae Meyer, 1931

References

 
Palaeacanthocephala